The Uba (Oba) is a river of Kazakhstan. 
 The river is a 278 km tributary stream to the transboundary Irtysh river, and has a surrounding drainage basin that is 9,850 km2 in size. It flows through the town Shemonaikha.

References 

Rivers of Kazakhstan